Nantha Kyun is an island off the coast of Rakhine State, Burma.

Geography

It is thickly wooded except on its western shores where the terrain is scarred between the crater and the shoreline.

Nearby islands
Highest point .

See also
List of islands of Burma

References 

Islands of Myanmar
Rakhine State
Mud volcanoes